Gerald Calvin "Jerry" Douglas (born May 28, 1956) is an American Dobro and lap steel guitar player and record producer. He is widely regarded as "perhaps the finest Dobro player in contemporary acoustic music, and certainly the most celebrated and prolific." A fourteen-time Grammy winner, he has been called “dobro’s matchless contemporary master,” by The New York Times, and is among the most innovative recording artists in music, both as a solo artist and member of numerous bands, such as Alison Krauss and Union Station and The Earls of Leicester. He has been a co-director of the Transatlantic Sessions since 1998.

Career

In addition to his fourteen solo recordings, Douglas has played on more than 1,600 albums.  As a sideman, he has recorded with artists as diverse as Garth Brooks, Ray Charles, Eric Clapton, Phish, Dolly Parton, Susan Ashton, Paul Simon, Mumford & Sons, Keb' Mo', Ricky Skaggs, Elvis Costello, Tommy Emmanuel, James Taylor and Johnny Mathis, as well as performing on the O Brother, Where Art Thou? soundtrack and the follow up "Down From the Mountain" tour with Alison Krauss and Union Station. He has collaborated with various groups including The Whites, New South (band), The Country Gentlemen, Strength in Numbers, and Elvis Costello's "Sugar Canes".

From 1996 to 1998, Douglas was a member of The GrooveGrass Boyz.

Douglas produced a number of records, including some at Sugar Hill Records. He oversaw albums by Alison Krauss, the Del McCoury Band, Maura O'Connell, Jesse Winchester and the Nashville Bluegrass Band, The Earls of Leicester, Gary Morris, The Steep Canyon Rangers. Along with Aly Bain, he serves as Music Director of the popular BBC Television series, "Transatlantic Sessions".

Since 1998, Douglas has been a member of Alison Krauss and Union Station, touring extensively and playing on a series of platinum-selling albums. When not on the road with Alison Krauss and Union Station, Douglas tours in support of his extensive body of work with his bands The Jerry Douglas Band and The Earls of Leicester, following the continued success of the latter's 2014 release The Earls of Leicester and 2015's Rattle and Roar.

Jerry Douglas appeared with Vince Gill on Eric Clapton's Crossroads Guitar Festival 2004 ("Oklahoma Borderline" and "What the Cowgirls Do").

Douglas also made a cameo in the third "United Breaks Guitars" consumer protest video, all of which went viral.

Personal life
Douglas was born in Warren, Ohio, United States, and now lives in Nashville, Tennessee, with his wife, Jill.

Awards and honors
As of 2021, Douglas has been nominated for thirty-two Grammy Awards, winning fourteen.

He has received the Country Music Association's 'Musician of the Year' award three times, in 2002, 2005 and 2007.

Douglas is a 10-time recipient of the International Bluegrass Music Association ("IBMA") Dobro Player of the Year Award.

In 2004, the National Endowment for the Arts awarded Douglas a National Heritage Fellowship, which is the United States' highest honor in the folk and traditional arts.

Douglas was named Artist in Residence for the Country Music Hall of Fame and Museum in 2008.

Douglas was honored at the 36th annual Telluride Bluegrass Festival in Colorado for his twenty-fifth consecutive year playing in and at the festival.

Douglas received the Bluegrass Star Award, presented by the Bluegrass Heritage Foundation of Dallas, Texas, on October 15, 2016. The award is bestowed upon bluegrass artists who do an exemplary job of advancing traditional bluegrass music and bringing it to new audiences while preserving its character and heritage.

The Americana Music Association honored Jerry Douglas with a Lifetime Achievement Award in 2011.

Douglas received the key to the city of Manchester, Tennessee as well as to Coffee County during a performance at the 2015 Bonnaroo Music and Arts Festival.

Discography

Studio recordings

Compilations

Other recordings
Remembrances and Forecasts 1974 as The Country Gentlemen
J.D. Crowe & The New South 1975 as J. D. Crowe & the New South
Holiday In Japan 	1975 as J. D. Crowe & the New South
New South Live 1975 as J. D. Crowe & the New South
Boone Creek 1977 as Boone Creek
One Way Track 1977 as Boone Creek
That Down Home Feeling 1977 as Buck White & Down Home Folks
Buck and Family Live 1979 as Buck White & Down Home Folks
More Pretty Girls Than One 1979 as Buck White & Down Home Folks
Bluegrass Album, Vol. 3 – California Connection 1983 as Bluegrass Album Band
Snakes Alive 1984 as Dreadful Snakes
Bluegrass Album Vol.4 1985 as Bluegrass Album Band
 High Country Snows  1985 Dan Fogelberg
T-Bone Burnett 1986 with T Bone Burnett
Bluegrass Album, Vol. 5 – Sweet Sunny South 1989 as Bluegrass Album Band
The Telluride Sessions 1989 as Strength in Numbers
Will the Circle Be Unbroken: Volume Two 1990 with the Nitty Gritty Dirt Band
Skip, Hop & Wobble 1993 as Barenberg, Douglas & Meyer
Toolin' Around "Let it Slide" with Arlen Roth and Sam Bush 1993
The Great Dobro Sessions 1994 as Jerry Douglas and various artists, produced by Jerry Douglas
Far From Enough 1994 with Viktor Krauss
Bluegrass Album, Vol. 6 – Bluegrass Instrumentals 1996 as Bluegrass Album Band
Bourbon & Rosewater 1996 as Bhatt, Douglas & Meyer
Yonder 1996 with Peter Rowan
Signs of Life 1996 Steven Curtis Chapman
Leading Roll 1997 with Sammy Shelor
The View From Here 1999 with Matt Flinner
O Brother, Where Art Thou? 2000 with Alison Krauss, The Whites, as Soggy Bottom Boys
Latitude 2001, with Matt Flinner
I Don't Need the Whiskey Anymore 2002, with Jack Lawrence
Deja Vu (All Over Again) 2004 with John Fogerty
 All I Really Want For Christmas  2005 Steven Curtis Chapman
Secret, Profane, & Sugarcane 2009 with Elvis Costello and the Sugarcanes
Southern Filibuster: The Songs of Tut Taylor 2010, produced by Jerry Douglas
Rounder Records 40th Anniversary Concert 2010 as Jerry Douglas with Bela Fleck, Alison Krauss & Union Station 
Get Low Original Motion Picture Soundtrack 2010 as Jerry Douglas
"The Boxer", with Paul Simon and Mumford & Sons on the latter's album Babel (released September 2012) and on Douglas's own Traveler, produced by Russ Titelman (released June 2012)
"One Light Shining" by Ruth Moody from These Wilder Things 2013
The Earls of Leicester 2014 with The Earls of Leicester produced by Jerry Douglas
Three Bells 2014 with Mike Auldridge and Rob Ickes produced by Jerry Douglas
Radio 2015 with The Steep Canyon Rangers produced by Jerry Douglas
Rattle & Roar 2016 with The Earls of Leicester produced by Jerry Douglas
"Love Like Me" and "Everything's The Same" from Billy Strings' album Home, released 2019
Leftover Feelings 2021 with John Hiatt, produced by Jerry Douglas and performed with the Jerry Douglas Band
Native American, 1992, with Tony Rice

With Alison Krauss or Alison Krauss and Union StationI've Got That Old Feeling (Producer And Performer) 1991Forget About It 1999New Favorite 2001Live - (Alison Krauss & Union Station) 2002Lonely Runs Both Ways 2004A Hundred Miles or More: A Collection 2007Paper Airplane 2011

 The Transatlantic Sessions Transatlantic Sessions 3 [Vol.1] (2007) (with Jerry Douglas and various artists)Transatlantic Sessions 3 [Vol.2] (2008) (with Jerry Douglas and various artists)The Original Transatlantic Sessions [Vol.2] (2008) (with Jay Ungar and various artists)The Original Transatlantic Sessions [Vol.3] (2009) (with Jay Ungar and various artists)Transatlantic Sessions 4[Vol.1] (2009) (with Jerry Douglas and various artists)Transatlantic Sessions 4[Vol.2] (2010) (with Jerry Douglas and various artists)Transatlantic Sessions 4[Vol.3] (2010) (with Jerry Douglas and various artists)

Awards

Grammy Awards
1983 Best Country Instrumental Performance: "Fireball" – with The New South
1994 Best Bluegrass Album: The Great Dobro Sessions2001 Album of the Year: Oh Brother, Where Art Thou? – various artists
2001 Best Country Performance by a Duo or Group: "The Lucky One" – Alison Krauss + Union Station 2001 Best Bluegrass Album: New Favorite – Alison Krauss + Union Station 2002 Best Country Instrumental Performance: "Foggy Mountain Breakdown" with Earl Scruggs 2002 Best Country Instrumental Performance: Earl Scruggs, Gary Scruggs, Randy Scruggs, Steve Martin, Leon Russell, Vince Gill, Jerry Douglas, Glen Duncan, Albert Lee, Paul Shaffer and Marty Stuart – "Foggy Mountain Breakdown"
2003 Best Country Instrumental Performance: "Cluck Old Hen" – Alison Krauss + Union Station
2003 Best Bluegrass Album: LIVE – Alison Krauss + Union Station
2004 Best Country Instrumental Performance: "Earl's Breakdown" – Nitty Gritty Dirt Band Featuring Earl Scruggs, Randy Scruggs, Vassar Clements & Jerry Douglas
2006 Best Country Performance By A Duo Or Group With Vocal: "Restless" – Alison Krauss and Union Station
2006 Best Country Instrumental Performance: "Unionhouse Branch" – Alison Krauss and Union Station
2006 Best Country Album: Lonely Runs Both Ways – Alison Krauss and Union Station
2012 Best Bluegrass Album: Paper Airplane – Alison Krauss and Union Station
2015 Best Bluegrass Album: The Earls of Leicester – The Earls of Leicester

Americana Music Association Awards
2002 Instrumentalist of the Year
2003 Instrumentalist of the Year
2011 Lifetime Achievement Award for Instrumentalist

CMA Awards
2002 Musician of the Year
2005 Musician of the Year
2007 Musician of the Year

IBMA (International Bluegrass Music Association) Awards
1990 Instrumental Performer of the Year – Dobro
1991 Instrumental Performer of the Year – Dobro
1992 Instrumental Album of the Year – Slide Rule, Jerry Douglas
1992 Record Event of the Year – Slide Rule1992 Instrumental Performer of the Year – Dobro
1993 Instrumental Performer of the Year – Dobro
1994 Instrumental Album of the Year – Skip, Hop & Wobble; Douglas, Barenberg & Meyer
1994 Instrumental Performer of the Year – Dobro
1995 Instrumental Album of the Year – The Great Dobro Sessions; Mike Auldridge, Curtis Burch, Jerry Douglas, Josh Graves, Rob Ickes, Oswald Kirby, Stacy Phillips, Tut Taylor, Sally Van Meter, Gene Wooten
1995 Record Event of the Year – The Great Dobro Sessions1995 Instrumental Performer of the Year – Dobro
1997 Album of the Year – True Life Blues—The Songs of Bill Monroe; Sam Bush, Vassar Clements, Mike Compton, Jerry Douglas, Stuart Duncan, Pat Enright, Greg Garing, Richard Greene, David Grier, David Grisman, John Hartford, Bobby Hicks, Kathy Kallick, Laurie Lewis, Mike Marshall, Del McCoury, Ronnie McCoury, Jim Nunally, Scott Nygaard, Mollie O'Brien, Tim O'Brien, Alan O'Bryant, Herb Pedersen, Todd Phillips, John Reischman, Peter Rowan, Craig Smith, Chris Thile, Tony Trischka, Roland White
1997 Record Event of the Year – True Life Blues—The Songs of Bill Monroe1997 Instrumental Album of the Year – Bluegrass Instrumentals, Volume 6; The Bluegrass Album Band
2001 Album of the Year - "O' Brother, Where Art Thou" Soundtrack -Norman Blake, James Carter & The Prisoners, The Cox Family, Fairfield Four, Emmylou Harris, John Hartford, Chris Thomas King, Alison Krauss, Jerry Douglas, The Peasall Sisters, The Soggy Bottom Boys, Ralph Stanley, The Stanley Brothers, Gillian Welch, The Whites; Mercury/Lost Highway Records 
2001 Instrumental Performer of the Year – Dobro
2002 Instrumental Performer of the Year – Dobro
2003 Album of the Year – Alison Krauss + Union Station Live, Alison Krauss + Union Station featuring Jerry Douglas
2003 Record Event of the Year – Will The Circle Be Unbroken Vol. III; Nitty Gritty Dirt Band, Matraca Berg, Sam Bush, June Carter Cash, Johnny Cash, Vassar Clements, Iris DeMent, Rodney Dillard, Jerry Douglas, Glen Duncan, Vince Gill, Josh Graves, Jamie Hanna, Emmylou Harris, Taj Mahal, Jimmy Martin, Del McCoury, Robbie McCoury, Ronnie McCoury, Jonathan McEuen, The Nashville Bluegrass Band, Willie Nelson, Tom Petty, Tony Rice, Earl Scruggs, Randy Scruggs, Ricky Skaggs, Doc Watson, Richard Watson, Glenn Worf & Dwight Yoakam
2015 Entertainer of the Year - The Earls of Leicester
2015 Instrumental Group of the Year - The Earls of Leicester
2015 Album of the Year - The Earls of Leicester, Jerry Douglas, producer
2015 Gospel Recorded Performance of the Year -  "Who Will Sing For Me" - The Earls of Leicester
2015 Instrumental Recorded Performance of the Year - The Three Bells - Jerry Douglas, Mike Auldridge, Rob Ickes
2015 Dobro Player of the Year - Jerry Douglas
2016 Entertainer of the Year - The Earls of Leicester
2016 Dobro Player of the Year - Jerry Douglas

National Endowment for the Arts
2004 National Heritage Fellowship

Country Music Hall of Fame
2008 Artist in Residence

Further reading
Humphrey, Mark. (1998). "Jerry Douglas". In The Encyclopedia of Country Music''. Paul Kingsbury, Editor. New York: Oxford University Press. p. 151.,

References

External links

Jerry Douglas official website
The Earls of Leicester official website
Alison Krauss and Union Station featuring Jerry Douglas official site
website of Transatlantic Sessions USA Tour
Folk Radio UK review of Jerry Christmas

1956 births
Living people
Alison Krauss & Union Station members
American country guitarists
American country singer-songwriters
American bluegrass guitarists
American male guitarists
American male singer-songwriters
National Heritage Fellowship winners
Slide guitarists
Grammy Award winners
Singer-songwriters from Ohio
Resonator guitarists
People from Warren, Ohio
The Country Gentlemen members
Weissenborn players
Guitarists from Ohio
20th-century American guitarists
Country musicians from Ohio
Bluegrass Album Band members
New South (band) members
Steel guitarists
The Earls of Leicester (band) members
Lyle Lovett and His Large Band members